Hans Hallén (9 October 1935 – 22 February 2013) was a Swedish bobsledder. He competed in the four-man event at the 1968 Winter Olympics.

References

External links
 

1935 births
2013 deaths
Swedish male bobsledders
Olympic bobsledders of Sweden
Bobsledders at the 1968 Winter Olympics
People from Sundsvall Municipality
Sportspeople from Västernorrland County